Hippasteria muscipula is one of twelve species of deep-sea sea star in the genus Hippasteria, which is in the family Goniasteridae.

Description and characteristics 
It is a regular, five-armed sea star, with a large and flattened central disc (as most species in this family). The body is covered by short and stout spines, and characterized by big, fly-trap like pedicellariae. When alive, the central disc is swollen, forming five radial bumps. It is a rather big species, and can grow up to 30 cm across.

This species seems to be a predator of deep sea coral and other cnidarians, and was observed climbing on corals in order to feed.

This species remained unknown to science until 2014, but since its description it was observed many times in its environment by deep-sea research missions, such as Okeanos Explorer 2015, off Hawaii.

Its name comes from its impressive pedicellariae, which look like traps of the carnivorous plant called "Venus fly trap" (Dionaea muscipula).

Habitat and repartition 
This species lives in the depths of Pacific Ocean, and has been recorded in Hawaii, New Caledonia and New Zealand, between 425 and 1500 meters deep.

Bibliography

References

Hippasteria
Animals described in 2014